Brihadratha was the 9th and last Emperor of the Mauryan Empire. He ruled from 187 to 185 BCE, when he was killed by his general, Pushyamitra Shunga, who went on to establish the Shunga Empire. The Mauryan territories, centred on the capital of Pataliputra, had shrunk considerably from the time of Ashoka to when Brihadratha came to the throne.

Reign
According to the Puranas, Brihadratha succeeded his father Shatadhanvan to the throne and ruled for three years.

Invasion of Demetrius I 

In 186 BCE, northwestern India (parts of modern-day Afghanistan and Pakistan) was occupied by the Greco-Bactrian king Demetrius (Dharmamita), followed by the overthrow of the Mauryan dynasty by the general Pushyamitra Shunga. The Mauryans had diplomatic alliances with the Greeks, and they may have been considered as allies by the Greco-Bactrians. A key detail is mentioned by Ceylonese Buddhist monks, pointing that Brihadratha married Demetrius' daughter, Berenice (Suvarnnaksi in Pali texts). The Greco-Bactrians may also have invaded India in order to protect Greek populations in the subcontinent. He established his rule in the Kabul Valley and parts of the Punjab region. Soon, however, they had to leave for Bactria to fight a fierce battle (probably between Eucratides I and Demetrius). 

The hypothesized Yavana invasion of Pataliputra is based in the Yuga Purana. Written in a prophetic, the a scripture describes the campaign of King Dharmamita:

Overthrow by Pushyamitra Shunga 

Brihadratha Maurya was killed in 185 BCE and power usurped by his general, Pushyamitra Shunga who then took over the throne and established the Shunga Empire. Bāṇabhaṭṭa's Harshacharita says that Pushyamitra, while parading the entire Mauryan army before Brihadratha on the pretext of showing him the strength of the army, crushed his master. Pushyamitra killed the former emperor in front of his military and established himself as the new ruler.

See also 
 Magadha
 Maurya Empire
 Shunga Empire

References

Citations

Sources
 

 

|-

Mauryan dynasty
Murdered Indian monarchs
2nd-century BC Indian monarchs
Year of birth unknown
2nd-century BC murdered monarchs
Mauryan emperors
Indian Buddhists